James V. Looney (1950 – 6 June 2022), known as Séamus Looney, was an Irish former hurler and Gaelic footballer. At club level he played with St Finbarr's and University College Cork and was also a member of the Cork senior teams as a dual player. In spite of a brief senior career, he was one of the most decorated players of his generation having won ten All-Ireland medals at various levels between 1967 and 1975.

Career
Born in Cork, Looney first came to prominence at colleges level with Coláiste Chríost Rí. After winning provincial colleges titles in both codes in 1968, he subsequently won a Hogan Cup title. Looney simultaneously made his first impact on the club scene and won a County Hurling Championship title with St Finbarr's in his first full season. His medical studies at University College Cork saw him spend five seasons lining out with the college in the championship and various other tournaments. During that time Looney claimed multiple Fitzgibbon Cup and Sigerson Cup titles, three County Championship titles across both codes and a Munster Club Championship title. 

On resuming his club career with St Finbarr's, he won an All-Ireland Club Championship in 1975. Looney began his inter-county career as a dual player at minor level with Cork. After winning consecutive All-Ireland Championships as a footballer, he subsequently won five All-Ireland titles in three seasons with the respective Cork under-21 teams. Looney was drafted onto the Cork senior hurling team in 1968 and was at midfield for their 1970 All-Ireland Championship success. His other honours include two Munster Championship titles, three National Hurling League titles and a Munster Championship title with the Cork senior football team.

Death
Looney died in Cork on 6 June 2022, aged 72.

Honours
Coláiste Chríost Rí
 Hogan Cup: 1968
 Corn Uí Mhuirí: 1968
 Dr. Harty Cup: 1968

University College Cork
 Munster Senior Club Football Championship: 1971
 Cork Senior Football Championship: 1969, 1973
 Cork Senior Hurling Championship: 1970
 Sigerson Cup: 1969, 1970, 1972
 Fitzgibbon Cup: 1971, 1972

St Finbarr's
 All-Ireland Senior Club Hurling Championship: 1975
 Munster Senior Club Hurling Championship: 1974
 Cork Senior Hurling Championship: 1968, 1974
 Cork Senior Football Championship: 1976

Cork
 All-Ireland Senior Hurling Championship: 1970
 Munster Senior Hurling Championship: 1969, 1970, 1972
 Munster Senior Football Championship: 1971
 National Hurling League: 1968–69, 1969–70, 1971–72
 All-Ireland Under-21 Hurling Championship: 1969, 1970, 1971
 All-Ireland Under-21 Football Championship: 1970, 1971
 Munster Under-21 Hurling Championship: 1969, 1970, 1971
 Munster Under-21 Football Championship: 1970, 1971
 All-Ireland Minor Football Championship: 1967, 1968
 Munster Minor Football Championship: 1967, 1968
 Munster Minor Hurling Championship: 1968

References

1950 births
2022 deaths
Dual players
UCC hurlers
UCC Gaelic footballers
St Finbarr's hurlers
St Finbarr's Gaelic footballers
Cork inter-county hurlers
Cork inter-county Gaelic footballers
All-Ireland Senior Hurling Championship winners
20th-century Irish medical doctors